Hiran Abeysekera is a Sri Lankan actor. He won the Laurence Olivier Award for Best Actor for his performance in the stage adaptation of Life of Pi. On television, he is known for his roles in Russell T Davies' A Midsummer Night's Dream (2016) and the tween dance series Find Me in Paris (2018–2019).

Early life and education
While Abeysekera was growing up, his father was a garage owner and his mother taught English. Abeysekera was educated at Nalanda College Colombo.

Having obtained a diploma from the Lanka Children's and Youth Theatre Foundation, he played the lead role in a British Council production of Peter Shaffer's Equus in 2007. This enabled him to audition for drama schools in the UK, following which he secured a place at the Royal Academy of Dramatic Art. He graduated in 2011.

Career
Abeysekera made his professional stage debut with the English Touring Theatre in 2011, playing Valere in Tartuffe.  In 2012 he joined the Royal Shakespeare Company in Stratford-Upon-Avon and was cast as Bartholomew in The Taming of the Shrew. In 2015, he played Peter Pan on the London stage.

In 2016, he returned to the Royal Shakespeare Company and played Puck in a film adaptation of A Midsummer Night's Dream, which was screened by the BBC. He played Posthumus in their stage production of Cymbeline at the Barbican Theatre London, and Horatio in Hamlet.

In 2018, Abeysekera began appearing in the Hulu series Find Me in Paris, portraying the role of Dash Khan until 2019. He played Pi Patel in the 2019 premiere of Lolita Chakrabarti's adaption of Life of Pi at the Crucible Theatre, Sheffield, for which he won a UK Theatre Award. In the same year, he was cast in the part of Leonardo da Vinci in the new play Botticelli in the Fire staged by the Hampstead Theatre, London. He then played Sunil Sharma in the play Behind the Beautiful Forevers at the Royal National Theatre.

In 2021, Abeysekera returned to the role of Pi Patel when Life of Pi transferred to the Wyndham's Theatre in London's West End. In 2022, he won the Olivier Award for Best Actor in a play for his performance.

Personal life
Abeysekera met his girlfriend while working on a show with Peter Brook in Paris. They stayed together at Dorset during the lockdown caused by the COVID-19 pandemic.

Filmography

Film

Television

Stage

Audio

Awards and nominations

References

External links
 
 Hiran Abeysekera at RADA

Living people
1986 births
Alumni of Nalanda College, Colombo
Alumni of RADA
Laurence Olivier Award winners
Royal Shakespeare Company members
Sri Lankan dramatists and playwrights
Sri Lankan male stage actors
Sinhalese male actors
Sri Lankan expatriates in the United Kingdom